Guido Georg Wilhelm Brause (7 August 1847, in Kochanowitz – 17 December 1922)  was a German botanist, specializing in ferns.

Brause studied at Koszęcin, in Poland.  Along with his botanical career he continued throughout his life a military career, first in the artillery during the Franco-Prussian War of 1870, then as an officer in Charlottenburg, with an expedition to Central Africa in 1907–1908. In retirement, he was associated with the botanical garden and museum in Berlin as well as the Botanischer Verein der Provinz Brandenburg (Botanical Association of Brandenburg Province).

Selected works 
 Beiträge zur Kenntnis der Gesteine des Fränkischen Jura, (1910).
 Die Farnpflanzen (Pteridophyta), (treatise on ferns; Pteridophyta), (1914) part of series "Kryptogamenflora für Anfänger : Eine Einführung in das Studium der blütenlosen Gewächse für Studierende und Liebhaber"; edited by Gustav Lindau, continued by Robert Knud Friedrich Pilger ; Torf- und Lebermoose und Farnpflanzen / Wilhelm Lorch, 6.
 Die Torf- und Lebermoose: die Farnpflanzen (Pteridophyta), (second edition 1926), (with Wilhelm Lorch and Heinrich Andres).

References

External links 

1847 births
People from Lubliniec County
1922 deaths
Place of death missing
19th-century German botanists
Pteridologists